In Zghmir (also known as In Z'Ghmir) is a town in south-central Algeria.

References 

Communes of Adrar Province